was a Japanese historian, founder of an influential historiographic school in postwar Japan known as the .

References
Isao Hirota, « Grandes tendances de l'historiographie japonaise depuis Meiji », Histoire, économie et société, vol. 25, no 2, 2006, p. 165-179 (in French) (link)

1907 births
1996 deaths
20th-century Japanese historians